Elections to Colchester Borough Council were held in 1978 alongside local elections across the United Kingdom.

Summary

Ward results

Berechurch

Birch-Messing 
 

 

No Conservative candidate as previous.

Boxted & Langham

Castle

Harbour 
 
 
 

 

 

No Liberal candidate as previous (–12.1).

Lexden 
 
 
 

 

 

No Liberal candidate as previous (–22.3).

Mile End

New Town

Prettygate 
 
 
 

 

 

No Liberal candidate as previous (–16.9).

Shrub End

St. Andrew's

St. Anne's

St. John's

St. Mary's

Stanway

Tiptree

West Bergholt

Winstree 
 
 
 

 

 

No Independent candidate as previous (–3.7).

Wivenhoe

References 

1978
1978 English local elections
1970s in Essex